Dance hall in its general meaning is a hall for dancing. From the earliest years of the twentieth century until the early 1960s, the dance hall was the popular forerunner of the discothèque or nightclub. The majority of towns and cities in the West had at least one dance hall, and almost always featured live musicians playing a range of music from strict tempo ballroom dance music to big band, swing and jazz. One of the most famous dance hall musicians was Glenn Miller.

Other structural forms of dance halls include the dance pavilion which has a roof but no walls, and the open-air platform which has no roof or walls. The open air nature of the dance pavilion was both a feature and a drawback. The taxi dance hall is a dance hall with a specific arrangement, wherein the patrons hire hall employees to dance with them.

The early days of rock n' roll were briefly played out in dance halls until they were superseded by nightclubs.

United States
Commercial dance halls in the United States began to appear toward the end of the nineteenth century and grew in popularity at the beginning of the twentieth century. These halls were generally frequented by working-class and/or immigrant teenagers that admired dance halls for their lack of chaperoning and convenience as cheap commercial leisure. The rapidly changing economy of the early twentieth century shifted the views many young adults had about the separation between work and leisure, increasing dance hall popularity from the 1900s into the 1920s.

With increased financial freedom, as compared to prior decades, young immigrant and working-class women were able to access dance halls, generally placed within urban areas, that did not require chaperones. Dance halls allowed young working-class women the opportunity to step outside of their extremely stressful home and work environments while not costing too much, or anything in some cases. These city dance halls were especially popular with newly independent immigrant women from more rural areas as country-side dances were often more closely monitored and tended to host styles of dancing that were considered more socially acceptable for performance in public spaces. The styles performed in city dance halls had dancing partners physically close, performing movements that would allow for limbs and body parts to graze each other in ways not seen in other partnered dance forms of the time.

Although interests in dance halls were growing, halls attracted negative attention from moral reformers and the media for the types of dancing done at these establishments, the sexual independence these environments allowed women, and the difficulty of regulating dance halls. Simple dance moves were already seen as morally wrong by select religious groups prior to the popularity of dance halls but with the additions of possibilities for prostitution, as well as access to alcohol, within dance halls reformers and religious leaders were increasingly against the existence of these halls. In order to discourage young adults from frequenting dance halls, media of the early twentieth century used subjective and inflammatory language to sway readers toward ideas that dance halls would morally corrupt young women while reformers petitioned to their local governments for regulation surrounding dance halls.

In 1917, through the assistance of the Fosdick Commission, a Board was organized in Louisville, Kentucky to standardize the public dance halls. Many young people, lacking in proper discrimination, attempted the irregular dancing in vogue in the commercial halls in the settlement house's dance hall, leading to a continual disagreement. A resident would say to a new couple dancing irregularly, "You can't dance that way in this hall." The couple in self-defense would answer, "I can dance that way in every other hall in the city."

Starting in the early 1930s, The Savoy, a dance hall in Harlem (a black neighborhood in New York City) was the first truly integrated building in the United States — for both the dancers and the musicians. "We didn't care about the color of your skin. All we wanted to know was: Can you dance?"

Texas has a high concentration of community dance halls, the largest number of them built by German and Czech immigrants.

Sweden and Finland

In Sweden and Finland, open air dance pavilions have been used mostly in summer, but especially in Finland some have also been built to be used throughout the year. Formerly, the dance pavilions were often built at sites with beautiful landscape, for example by the lakes.

See also
Ballroom
Dance club, the successor of the dance hall

References

Further reading
 Cressey, Paul. The Taxi-Dance Hall: A Sociological Study in Commercialized Recreation and City Life  (1923; reprint University of Chicago Press 2008), Famous study of Chicago in the 1920s.
 Nott, James. Going to the Palais: A Social And Cultural History of Dancing and Dance Halls in Britain, 1918-1960 (2015)

External links
 Dance Halls  at Encyclopedia of Oklahoma History and Culture